Marta Lucía Ramírez Blanco (born 4 July 1954) is a Colombian lawyer and politician who served as Vice President of Colombia from 2018 to 2022. She also served as the Minister of Foreign Affairs of Colombia. In 2018, Ramírez became the first woman elected to serve as Vice President of Colombia, running on a ticket with Iván Duque Márquez. In 2021, after the resignation of her predecessor Claudia Blum, she was pronounced chancellor by the president Iván Duque Márquez.

Elected Senator of Colombia in 2006, Ramírez introduced legislative initiatives to permit women to attain the rank of General in the Military Forces of Colombia, and to mandate English teaching in schools. Ramírez was Colombia’s first female Minister of National Defence, serving from 2002 to 2003 in the administration of President Álvaro Uribe Vélez, and the second woman in Latin America to hold this title. She has also served as the 6th Minister of Foreign Trade of Colombia, from 1998 to 2002.

In 2009 she resigned from the Senate to run as a candidate for the 2010 Conservative Party's presidential nomination, finishing third to the eventual Conservative nominee Noemí Sanín Posada. In 2014, she once again ran for the Conservative nomination, this time winning the nomination, but ultimately finishing third in the first round of the 2014 presidential election. Ramirez is also a member of Washington D.C. based think tank, The Inter-American Dialogue.

Personal life
Ramírez was born on 4 July 1954 in Zipaquira, Cundinamarca, Colombia to Álvaro Ramírez Suárez and Alba Blanco Venturoli, the eldest and only daughter of their four children. In 1974 she married Álvaro Rincón, a Colombian architect; together they have one daughter, María Alejandra. She is of Italian descent through her mother, and thorough her father, she is related to Jesús Ramírez Suárez, her uncle, who served as Chamber Representative for Cundinamarca.

A lawyer from the Pontifical Xavierian University, she holds a specialization degree in Legal Sciences and Socioeconomics, and postgraduate specialisations in Financial Law from the University of the Andes, and in Business Management from  INALDE Business School. In 1996 she received a fellowship from Harvard University's Center for International Affairs, focusing on the internationalisation of the Colombian economy in the context of the rise of regional blocs and economic and commercial integration.

Career

Minister of Foreign Trade
In 1997 Ramirez returned to Colombia as Noemi Sanin’s campaign manager who ran for office in 1998. When Sanin lost the race, the new president Andres Pastrana appointed Ramirez as Minister of Foreign Trade from 1998 until 2002. During this period she was  rated as the best minister of Pastrana’s cabinet in several polls. Her most important achievements were the design and implementation of a 10-year Strategic Plan for exports, competitiveness and entrepreneurship policy for Colombia. At the end of Pastrana’s administration, Ramirez was appointed as Colombian ambassador to France.  Only four months later, Alvaro Uribe was elected President and appointed Ramirez to become his Defence Minister.

Ambassador of Colombia in France
In 2002 Ramírez was then appointed as ambassador of Colombia in France for a few months. With the election of Álvaro Uribe as President of Colombia, Ramírez went back to Colombia.

Minister of National Defence

Marta Lucia Ramirez was the 20th Minister of National Defence, the second woman in Latin America to hold this title after Michelle Bachelet who later became President of Chile. Ramirez served as Defence Minister from 2002 until 2003. Her most significant contributions to Alvaro Uribe’s government were the design and implementation of a 10-year Democratic Security Policy and her focus on civilian control over the military in order to maintain efficiency and legitimacy of the military forces in the war against the Colombian guerrillas, paramilitaries and narcotrafickers. During her term in the Defence Ministry, she designed and implemented the massive demobilisation program for guerrilla members, which focuses on young guerrillas to combat the FARC's recruitment of child soldiers. Under the leadership of President Uribe, she also implemented the security of Colombian roads through a program called “Live Colombia travel through it”, and designed a program focused on transparency and efficiency in the military procurement. She also initiates a group of civilian advisors to implement a reform in the Colombian Police, in order to complement the military fight against terrorism in urban locations. After serving as the Ministry of Defence, Ramirez became a private consultant in trade and security. She then became advisor for the World Trade Organisation where she was appointed Chairwoman for the panel of experts at the Airbus-Boeing Trade panel. She resigned to run for the Colombian Senate in 2006 where she was elected with a high majority of opinion votes in the U Party, a new political party organised under Uribe’s government.

Senator of Colombia
Elected as President of the International Affairs and Defence Commission in the Colombian Senate. As a senator she authored Law 1253/08 law for Colombian competitiveness; 1286/09 law for Science Technology and Innovation; 1190/09 law in favor of displaced people and different bills for public Universities, women protection, bilingual education and also presented political control debates to the executive branch. Due to her critics because of clientelism and corruption within the party, she organized dissidence with Gina Parody and Nicolas Uribe. Later Ramirez was against a third election of Alvaro Uribe as a Colombian president so she decided to resign from the party and the Congress. In 2010 she participated as a candidate for the Colombian presidency within the conservative party to which she still belongs.

In 2016 she and Nigeria Renteria Lozano were appointed as peace negotiators with the Revolutionary Armed Forces of Colombia (FARC). Various organisations had asked the director of UN Women and a Deputy Secretary-General of the United Nations to intercede to get women appointed. The war with FARC had lasted 50 years at that point and consumed 600,000 lives.

Vice presidency (2018–2022) 

On 17 June 2018, Ramírez was elected Colombia's first female vice president, alongside former senator Iván Duque Márquez. She assumed office on 7 August 2018.

During COVID-19 pandemic in Colombia, on 23 October 2020 Ramírez tested positive for COVID-19 but was asymptomatic, becoming the highest Colombian official to get infected.

Ramírez left office on 7 August 2022 and was succeeded as vice president by Francia Márquez, whilst Álvaro Leyva replaced her as foreign minister.

Honours 
: Grand Gwanghwa Medal of the Order of Diplomatic Service Merit (6 May 2022)

References

External links
 Biography by CIDOB

|-

|-

|-

|-

|-

|-

1954 births
Living people
Ambassadors of Colombia to France
Candidates for President of Colombia
Colombian people of Italian descent
Colombian women lawyers
Colombian Conservative Party politicians
Colombian Ministers of Defense
Colombian women ambassadors
Democratic Center (Colombia) politicians
Female defence ministers
Female foreign ministers
Harvard Fellows
Members of the Senate of Colombia
Ministers of Foreign Trade of Colombia
People from Zipaquirá
Pontifical Xavierian University alumni
Social Party of National Unity politicians
University of La Sabana alumni
Vice presidents of Colombia
Women government ministers of Colombia
Women vice presidents
Foreign ministers of Colombia
21st-century Colombian women politicians
21st-century Colombian politicians
People named in the Pandora Papers
Members of the Inter-American Dialogue
20th-century Colombian lawyers